Antti Halonen (14 June 1885, Jaakkima - 5 July 1942) was a Finnish farmer, lay preacher and politician. He was a member of the Parliament of Finland from 1930 until his death in 1942, representing the Agrarian League.

References

1885 births
1942 deaths
People from Lakhdenpokhsky District
People from Viipuri Province (Grand Duchy of Finland)
Finnish Lutherans
Centre Party (Finland) politicians
Members of the Parliament of Finland (1930–33)
Members of the Parliament of Finland (1933–36)
Members of the Parliament of Finland (1936–39)
Members of the Parliament of Finland (1939–45)
Finnish people of World War II
20th-century Lutherans